Davina Oriakhi is a London-based Nigerian singer, songwriter and poet. She was awarded the Choice Female Artist at the Nigerian Teen Choice Awards in 2016.

Early life
Davina Oriakhi was born in London, England to Nigerian parents but was raised for most of her life in Abuja, Nigeria. She is a native of the Bini people of Nigeria. Davina Oriakhi attended secondary school at CherryField College, and then pursued a bachelor's degree in accounting at Covenant University. She later pursued a master's degree in media and communications at City University London.

Musical career

2014 
Davina Oriakhi released her debut single, Content. She released a collage video of the single the same year.

2017 
In 2017, Davina Oriakhi released three singles: Silence (Father Have Mercy) in April,  F.S.L.S in May and Juju in June which led up to the release of her debut album, Love to a Mortal in July. Davina Oriakhi released three videos for her singles It's All About Love, Content and F.S.L.S later that year.

2018 
Davina Oriakhi released her first collaboration and single after her album in early 2018, featuring Tim Lyre on the song Lagos in March and another with Canadian R&B singer Preyé on the song Vanity in April.

Artistry
Davina Oriakhi's music is written and sung in mostly in English and sometimes Pidgin, and mixes different genres. She admits most of her songs are derived from personal experiences.

Influences
Davina Oriakhi asserts that her music is largely derived from her own personal experiences. According to her,

Her other musical influences are Disney, Lauryn Hill, Sade, Alicia Keys, Erykah Badu and Kirk Franklin.

Discography

Videography

Awards and nominations

References

External links
 Davina Oriakhi on Facebook

Living people
1994 births
Residents of Lagos
Nigerian songwriters
21st-century Nigerian women singers